Bunde is a village in the Dutch province of Limburg. It is located in the municipality of Meerssen, about 2 km northwest of Meerssen itself.

History 
The village was first mentioned in 893 as Bundende. The etymology is unclear. Bunde developed on the eastern flank of the Maas Valley. In 1626, it became an independent heerlijkheid. Between June 1814 until May 1815, it was part of Prussia, but awarded to the Kingdom of the Netherlands by the Congress of Vienna.

The Old St Agnes Church is a single aisled church with a double tower at the front. In 1714, the medieval church was replaced by the current church. The tower burnt down in 1822 after a lightning strike. The New St Agnes Church is an aisleless church with concrete tower built between 1959 and 1960.

Bunde was home to 386 people in 1840. It was a separate municipality until 1982, when it became part of the municipality Meerssen.

Transportation

Bunde railway station
 Bus services - 17, 52, 98

Notable people 
 Angel-Eye (born 1974), artist, composer and producer
 Willem Victor Bartholomeus (1825–1892), organist and composer
 Jef Lahaye (1932–1990), racing cyclist
 Jan Lambrichs (1915–1990), racing cyclist
 Godfried Pieters (born 1936), sculptor
 Manouk Pluis (born 1999), actress
 Kyara Stijns (born 1995), racing cyclist
 Pauline van de Ven (born 1956), writer and visual artist

Gallery

References

Populated places in Limburg (Netherlands)
Former municipalities of Limburg (Netherlands)
Meerssen